Djerv is a letter, but may also refer to:

SK Djerv 1919
Djerv SK, an association football team in Norway's 2009 3. divisjon
Djerv, old name of FK Jerv
Djerv, old name of Heggedal IL
Djerv, old name of Bygdø BK
Djerv (band), Norway metal band leb by vocalist Agnete Kjølsrud